A Hill in Korea is a 1956 British war film based on Max Catto's 1953 novel of the same name. The original name was Hell in Korea, but it was changed for distribution reasons—except in the US. It was directed by Julian Amyes and produced by Anthony Squire. Incidental music was written by Malcolm Arnold.

It was the first major feature film to portray British troops in action during the Korean War and introduces Michael Caine (himself a veteran of the Korean War) in his first credited film role. There are also early screen appearances by Stanley Baker, Robert Shaw and Ronald Lewis.

Plot
During the Korean War in 1951, a small force of British soldiers is in danger of being cut off by the advancing Chinese army. The plot emphasizes the plight of the National Servicemen who, as they say, were "old enough to fight, but too young to vote."

The film also depicts a "friendly-fire" incident, in which the British are bombed by the Americans.

The film opens in Korea with a British Army patrol, led by Lt. Butler. In the patrol is tough veteran Sergeant Payne, a slightly psychotic Corporal Ryker, and the cowardly signaller Wyatt. As they search a small village, one of the party falls victim to a bomb planted in a small shack. With the death of one of his men, Butler moves the patrol out of the village. Out in the open plain, Butler and Payne discover a large force of Chinese soldiers heading directly for them. Sending Payne and the patrol back towards their own lines, Butler and three of his men stay behind to cover the withdrawal. After fending off two attacks, Butler discovers Lance Corporal Hodge is dead. Payne returns with the patrol, informing Butler that they were cut off by other enemy forces.

The patrol heads through the village and up a winding path towards an isolated temple located on a hill, with only a steep cliff to its rear. On the way, Wyatt throws away the only radio because he cannot be bothered to carry it up the hill. Then they run into an enemy patrol on the path. They ambush the Chinese, and continue up to the temple. With the Chinese knowing now exactly where they are, Butler must keep his troops together, and fend off the enemy attacks.

Cast

Production
The film was based on a novel by Max Catto which was published in 1954 and based on true events.

Shooting
The film was shot on location in Portugal and at Shepperton Studios.

Michael Caine was cast in part because of his experience in the Korean War, where he had served as a soldier. He later said, "My function as a technical advisor was completely ignored during the making of the film. For example, I advised the crew to spread the troops wide as the latter advanced, which was militarily correct, but they replied that they didn't have a lens of sufficient width to take it all in! I also pointed out that the officer would have removed his signs of rank and worn a hat, the same as the other men, to disguise which one was in command, but George [Baker] was allowed to go into battle with all badges and hat gleaming, every inch an officer. In a real fight, he would never have lasted all of ten seconds."

Caine added, "The most glaring mistake that I never brought to their notice was that Portugal did not in the least resemble Korea; if anything, Wales was more similar. I did not say anything because I wanted to stay in Portugal – I could go to Wales at any old time."

Caine later recalled, "I had eight lines in that picture, and I screwed up six of them."

Release
According to Caine, "the company held on to the film for ages before releasing it. After a year of waiting for the perfect moment, with true movie genius they premiered the film on the night that we invaded Suez. The picture went straight down the pan, and my movie career along with it. I bemoaned the fact that nobody had seen the film, until I actually saw it myself. I was terrible! My voice was awful...My eyelashes are blond and so are my eyebrows, which has the effect in close-up of something speaking that hasn't got a face, and it's not much better in medium shot..My appearances were mercifully few, the editor having decided that the cutting-room floor was the ideal place for my first effort at international stardom."

The Los Angeles Times called it "taut, no-nonsense".

References
 Time Out Film Guide, published by Penguin –

Notes

External links
 
 
 
 A Hill in Korea at History on Film
 A Hill in Korea at Letterbox DVD
 A Hill in Korea at TCMDB
 A Hill in Korea at BFI

1956 films
1956 war films
British war films
Films based on British novels
Korean War films
Films with screenplays by Ian Dalrymple
Films scored by Malcolm Arnold
Films set in 1951
Films shot in Portugal
Films shot at Shepperton Studios
1950s English-language films
1950s British films
British black-and-white films